"Do It Again" is a song by American rapper NLE Choppa, released on October 7, 2022 alongside a music video. It features American rapper 2Rare and was produced by Fye Man. The song contains a sample of "Love Don't Live Here Anymore" by Rose Royce.

Background and composition
The song was released shortly after NLE Choppa publicly split with his girlfriend Marissa DaNae. Over a "punchy, fast-paced" drum beat, Choppa boasts about moving on from the relationship and what his ex has lost.

Critical reception
Lamar Banks of HotNewHipHop gave the song a "Hottttt" rating. Alex Gonzalez of Uproxx described Choppa as "delivering fiery bars" and wrote that 2Rare "shows off his vocal stylings, singing and rapping humorous one-liners on his verse", also praising his line "Bitch, you like a squirrel, you just like Sandy, bitch, get off my nuts" as one of the standout lines in the song.

Music video
The music video was directed by NLE Choppa himself. It sees the two artists throwing a neighborhood party, where they are seen dancing, grilling wings, smashing cakes, and joined by twerking women.

Charts

References

2022 songs
2022 singles
NLE Choppa songs
Songs written by NLE Choppa
Warner Records singles